The 1894 Tennessee gubernatorial election was held on November 6, 1894. Incumbent Democrat Peter Turney defeated Republican nominee Henry Clay Evans with 45.06% of the vote.

General election

Candidates
Major party candidates
Peter Turney, Democratic
Henry Clay Evans, Republican 

Other candidates
A. L. Mims, People's

Results

References

1894
Tennessee
Gubernatorial